Milles is a surname. Notable people with the surname include:

Carl Milles (1875-1955), Swedish sculptor
Isaac Milles (1638 – 1720), English cleric
George Milles, 1st Earl Sondes (1824–1894), British peer and Conservative politician
George Milles-Lade, 2nd Earl Sondes (1861–1907), English cricketer, the son of the 1st Earl Sondes
Henry Milles (cricketer) (1867–1937), English cricketer, the son of the 1st Earl Sondes
Henry Milles-Lade, 5th Earl Sondes (1940–1996), the son of Henry Milles
Richard Milles (c. 1735 - 1820), English landowner and politician
Samuel Milles (1669–1729), MP for Canterbury
Thomas Milles (bailiff) (1550?– 1627?), English customs official

See also
Millis (disambiguation)